Hrannar Hólm (born April 17, 1964) is an Icelandic former basketball coach. He was the head coach of the Danish women's national basketball team from 2014 to 2017. From 2011 to 2014, he led SISU BK to four straight Dameligaen championships.

Career

Iceland
Hrannar coached for five seasons in the Icelandic Úrvalsdeild karla, accumulating a 62-34 record (64,6%). His best season came in 1995-1996 when he led defending champions Njarðvík to a 28-4 record, including a 17-game winning streak to finish the season. Although the team had the best record in the league it fell out in the quarter finals in the playoffs against Keflavík.

Denmark
Hrannar took over as coach of SISU BK late in the 2009-2010 season when the team was in 8-9th place and helped it achieve 2nd-place finish. For the next four seasons he guided the club to four national championships. He was named the coach of the year in 2010 and 2014. In may of 2014 he was hired as the head coach of the Danish women's national basketball team.

References

External links
FIBA Europe profile
Úrvalsdeild statistics

1964 births
Living people
Icelandic basketball coaches
Hrannar Holm
Hrannar Holm
Hrannar Holm
Hrannar Holm
Keflavík men's basketball players
KR men's basketball coaches
Njarðvík men's basketball coaches
Þór Akureyri men's basketball coaches